"Chapter Sixty-One: Halloween" is the fourth episode of the fourth season of the American television series Riverdale and the 61st episode of the series overall. The episode was directed by Erin Feeley and written by Janine Salinas Schoenberg.

It originally aired on The CW on October 30, 2019 and according to Nielsen Media Research, was watched by 0.74 million viewers.

Plot
On the eve of Halloween, Riverdale families receive videotapes of their houses being watched for hours upon hours. As Halloween approaches, Cheryl and Toni re-bury Jason’s body, but Cheryl is worried that Jason’s ghost will now haunt Thistlehouse. After a seance in the Blossom chapel, Nana Rose reveals that Cheryl was supposed to have a second brother named Julian, but she absorbed him before birth. Meanwhile, at Stonewall Prep, Jughead’s classmates haze him and lock him inside a coffin in Mr. Chipping’s office for Halloween night. Elsewhere, Archie and Munroe throw a Halloween party for the kids of the community in order to keep Dodger away, but the party ends in Dodger shooting one of the kids who attended the party. Veronica wards off an escaped patient from Shady Grove, as he poses as another man and tries to murder her in the speakeasy. Betty and Jellybean, while home alone, receive phone calls by someone claiming to be the Black Hood. When Charles tracks the phone calls, Betty learns that they are coming from Polly. An ominous closing flash-forward shows F.P. and Betty at the coroner’s office identifying what appears to be Jughead's dead body.

Cast and characters

This episode includes some characters dressed in Halloween costumes:

Starring
 KJ Apa as Archie Andrews / Pureheart the Powerful
 Lili Reinhart as Betty Cooper / Laurie Strode
 Camila Mendes as Veronica Lodge 
 Cole Sprouse as Jughead Jones
 Madelaine Petsch as Cheryl Blossom / Poison Ivy
 Mark Consuelos as Hiram Lodge
 Casey Cott as Kevin Keller
 Skeet Ulrich as F.P. Jones
 Mädchen Amick as Alice Cooper
 Charles Melton as Reggie Mantle
 Vanessa Morgan as Toni Topaz / Harley Quinn

Guest starring
 Eli Goree as Munroe "Mad Dog" Moore / The Shield
 Cody Kearsley as Moose Mason 
 Wyatt Nash as Charles Smith 
 Juan Riedinger as Dodger Dickenson 
 Tiera Skovbye as Polly Cooper (voice) 
 Kerr Smith as Principal Holden Honey 
 Sam Witwer as Rupert Chipping 
 Alex Barima as Johnathan 
 Ben Cotton as Michael Matthews 
 Sean Depner as Bret Weston Wallis 
 Sarah Desjardins as Donna Sweett 
 Ajay Friese as Eddie 
 Trinity Likins as Jellybean Jones / Rosie the Riveter
 Doralynn Mui as Joan 
 Alvin Sanders as Pop Tate 
 Barbara Wallace as Rose Blossom

Co-starring
 Trevor Stines as Jason Blossom
 Nikolai Witschl as Dr. Curdle Jr.

Music

On October 31, 2019, WaterTower Music released the score soundtrack from the "Halloween" episode was composed by Blake Neely and Sherri Chung. Haley Reinhart's "Shook", Ural Thomas & the Pain's "Eenie Meenie" and The Chordettes' "Mr. Sandman" are heard in the episode, but not included in the soundtrack.

All music is composed by Blake Neely and Sherri Chung.

Reception

Ratings
In the United States, the episode received a 0.2/1 percent share among adults between the ages of 18 and 49, meaning that it was seen by 0.2 percent of all households, and 1 percent of all of those watching television at the time of the broadcast. It was watched by 0.74 million viewers.

Critical response
On Rotten Tomatoes, the episode has a rating of 86%, based on 7 reviews.

See also

 Archie's Super Teens
 Harley & Ivy Meet Betty & Veronica
 Blossoms 666
 Ouija board
 Robert (doll)

References

External links
 
 

2019 American television episodes
Halloween television episodes
Riverdale (2017 TV series) episodes
Fiction set in 2019
Fiction set in 2020